Paik Gahuim (born July 26, 1974) is a modern South Korean writer known for his disturbing stories.

Life
Paik Gahuim was born July 26, 1974 in Iksan, Jeollanam-do, South Korea. Baek Ga-heum debuted in 2001 when his short story “Flounder” was the winning entry in the Seoul Shinmun’s spring literary contest.

Work
Paik's work often makes readers feel uncomfortable, as in the case of his debut story which begins with a detailed description of filleting a flounder and then progresses to a portrayal of the narrator having intercourse with a girl from a hostess bar while imagining the inside of his mother’s womb. “When the Pear Blossoms Fade” describes the shocking abuse of children and the handicapped. In “Welcome, Baby” a young child watches a middle-aged couple have intercourse from inside a motel room closet, an infant without eyes or ears is abandoned, and a man tries to hang himself from a fan. In “Here Comes Cricket,” an aged mother who is beaten by her own son plans to end both their lives through joint suicide and “Dress Shoes” features a father who kills his entire family and then takes his own life. Although these ruthless stories fill readers with much discomfort, they are not too far-fetched, for the newspapers, television, and the Internet are full of stories like these. Baek Ga-heum's “The Tomb of a Ship” describes blood-curdling crime in a small port town. The return of a
photo criminal past the statute of limitations to his hometown results in vengeful violence and murder, a subversion of dichotomy between good and evil.

Paik's characters tend to the neglected and marginalized—those who are both socially and economically on the bottom rung of society: prostitutes, itinerant manual laborers, sailors running from the law, the mentally and physically handicapped, the elderly homeless living in condemned buildings, and women who are physically and sexually abused. A great number of these characters suffer from speech disorders or lack the mental capacity to recognize the gravity of the situation; the few who do realize their dire circumstances are without the proper education to articulate themselves.

Works in Korean (partial)
 Flounder (2001)
 When the Pear Blossoms Fade
 Welcome, Baby
 Here Comes Cricket
 The Tomb of a Ship

References 

1974 births
Living people
South Korean writers